Orlovka is a rural locality (a village) in Podlubovsky Selsoviet, Karmaskalinsky District, Bashkortostan, Russia. The population was 378 as of 2010. There are 4 streets.

Geography 
Orlovka is located 38 km west of Karmaskaly (the district's administrative centre) by road. Podlubovo is the nearest rural locality.

References 

Rural localities in Karmaskalinsky District